Expedition 42 was the 42nd expedition to the International Space Station. It began on 10 November 2014 with the undocking of Soyuz TMA-13M, returning the crew of Expedition 41 to Earth and ended with the undocking of Soyuz TMA-14M on 11 March 2015.

Crew

Source Spacefacts

Mission
One of the key aspects of Mission 42 - and other missions in 2015 - is the preparation (that is, reconfiguration) of parts of the ISS to allow commercial space taxis to dock at the station. The mission requires several space walks in 2015 to prepare a berthing slip is being prepared at the forward end of the Harmony connecting node where Space Shuttles formerly docked, and another on Harmonys zenith port. These new ports will allow for the Boeing's CST-100 and SpaceX's Dragon capsules to dock at the ISS. The first paid passengers are expected to arrive in 2019.

Gallery

In popular culture
 A fictionalized version of Expedition 42 is depicted in the 2013 film Gravity. The crew, never shown, is forced to evacuate the International Space Station in a Soyuz capsule before the orbital debris arrive.
 To commemorate the Expedition number's connection to Hitchhiker's Guide to the Galaxy comic science fiction franchise, the crew released a poster in the style of the 2005 film.

References

External links

 NASA's Space Station Expeditions page

Expeditions to the International Space Station
2014 in spaceflight
2015 in spaceflight